Carmont is a surname.  Notable people with the surname include:

 John Carmont, Lord Carmont (1880–1965), senior Scottish High Court Judge
 George Carmont (born 1978), retired New Zealand professional rugby league footballer
 Francis Carmont (born 1981), French professional mixed martial artist

Fictional 
 Hugo Carmont, a character in the New Zealand soap opera Shortland Street

See also 
 Carmont railway station in Scotland 
 Carmont derailment in Scotland